Carolyn Males (born 1946), was an American writer and photographer. She wrote romance novels in collaboration under the pseudonyms Alyssa Howard, Clare Richards and Clare Richmond from 1982 to 1993. She also collaborated in non-fiction books and her articles has appeared in Reader's Digest, Travel-Holiday, Brides, Parade, Cosmopolitan, Saturday Evening Post, Odyssey, Writer's Digest, Newsday, The Washington Post, The Baltimore Sun and other publications.

Biography
Carolyn Males was born in 1946. She joined a literary critique group in Maryland. There she wrote a collaborative effort with other three women, Louise Titchener, Ruth Glick, and Eileen Buckholtz. The result was a romance novel, Love is Elected, published by Silhouette Books under the pseudonym Alyssa Howard, and they also wrote other novel, Southern Persuasion. But they decided split them into groups of two, and she collaborated with Louise Titchener under the pseudonyms of Clare Richards and Clare Richmond.

Carolyn Males lives in Clarksville, Maryland.

Bibliography

As Alyssa Howard
Single romance novels
Love is Elected (1982)
Southern Persuasion (1983)

As Clare Richards
Single novels
Renaissance Summer (1985 Mar)

As Clare Richmond
Single novels
Runaway heart (1986 Nov)
Bride's Inn (1987 Sep)
Pirate's legacy (1990 Jul)
Hawaiian Heat (1993 Feb)

As Carolyn Males 
Non-fiction
Life After High School (1986) (with Roberta Feigen)
How to write & sell a column (1987) (with Julie Raskin)
Wish You Were Here! (1999) (with Carol Barbier Rolnick and Pam Makowski Goresh)

References and sources

1946 births
Living people
American romantic fiction writers
American women novelists
American photographers
20th-century American novelists
20th-century American women writers
Place of birth missing (living people)
American women photographers
Women romantic fiction writers
21st-century American women